Cross-country skiing at the 1986 Asian Winter Games took place in the city of Sapporo, Japan with six events contested — three each for men and women.

Medalists

Men

Women

Medal table

References
 Results of the First Winter Asian Games

 
1986 Asian Winter Games events
1986
1986 in cross-country skiing